is a railway station on the Kashihara Line in the city of Nara, Japan, operated by Kintetsu Railway.

Lines
Amagatsuji Station is served by the Kashihara Line.

Layout
The station has two side platforms.

Platforms
The station has two side platforms serving one track each.

History
 1921: Amagatsuji Station was opened on the Unebi Line by the Osaka Electric Tramway.
 1941: It was owned by the Kansai Express Railway that merged with the Sangu Express Railway.
 2000: The building of the station was rebuilt underground.
 April 1, 2007: PiTaPa, a reusable contactless stored value smart card, has been available.

Surrounding area
 
 Kikō-ji Temple
 Tōshōdai-ji Temple

See also
 List of railway stations in Japan

References

External links

 

Railway stations in Nara Prefecture
Railway stations in Japan opened in 1921